HD 74156 is a yellow dwarf star (spectral type G0V) in the constellation of Hydra, 187 light years from the Solar System. It is known to be orbited by two giant planets.

Star
This star is 24% more massive and 64% larger than the Sun. The total luminosity is 2.96 times that of the Sun and its temperature 5960 K. The age of the star is estimated at 3.7 billion years, with metallicity 1.35 times that of the Sun based on its abundance of iron.

Planetary system
In April 2001, two giant planets were announced orbiting the star. The first planet HD 74156 b orbits the star at a distance closer than Mercury is to the Sun, in an extremely eccentric orbit. The second planet HD 74156 c is a long-period, massive planet (at least 8 times the mass of Jupiter), which orbits the star in an elliptical orbit with a semimajor axis of 3.90 astronomical units. In 2022, the inclination and true mass of HD 74156 c were measured via astrometry.

Claims of a third planet
Given the two-planet configuration of the system under the assumption that the orbits are coplanar and have masses equal to their minimum masses, an additional Saturn-mass planet would be stable in a region between 0.9 and 1.4 AU between the orbits of the two known planets. Under the "packed planetary systems" hypothesis, which predicts that planetary systems form in such a way that the system could not support additional planets between the orbits of the existing ones, the gap would be expected to host a planet.

In September 2007, a third planet with a mass at least 0.396 Jupiter masses was announced to be orbiting between planets b and c with an eccentric orbit. The planet, orbiting in a region of the planetary system previously known to be stable for additional planets, was seen as a confirmation of the "packed planetary systems" hypothesis. However, Roman V. Baluev has cast doubt on this discovery, suggesting that the observed variations may be due to annual errors in the data. A subsequent search using the Hobby-Eberly Telescope also failed to confirm the planet, and further data obtained using HIRES instrument strongly contradicts its existence.

See also
 List of extrasolar planets
 HD 37124
 Upsilon Andromedae

References

External links
 
 Extrasolar Planet Interactions by Rory Barnes & Richard Greenberg, Lunar and Planetary Lab, University of Arizona

Hydra (constellation)
074156
042327
G-type main-sequence stars
Planetary systems with two confirmed planets
BD+05 2035
J08422511+0434411